Barone may refer to:

Barone (surname)
Pizzo Barone, a mountain in the Swiss Alps
Baron, a title of nobility
Metamizole, by the trade name Barone
Bar One, sometimes spelt BarOne, a brand of South African chocolate.
BARON.E, Swiss musical pop duo